Scutellaria drummondii, commonly known as Drummond's skullcap, is a species of herbaceous shrub native to the southern United States and north-eastern Mexico.

References

drummondii